= Vietnamese Lady =

1992 Hong Kong film by Ka Ka

- Traditional Chinese: 她來自胡志明市
- Simplified Chinese: 她来自胡志明市
- Hanyu Pinyin: Tā Laízì Húzhìmíng Shì
- Directed by: Ka Ka
- Written by: Heung Sang Kong
- Produced by: Li Quansheng; Xiao Di
- Starring: Gwok Yee Lee; Melvin Wong; Ling Ga; Chan Wing Chun
- Cinematography: Gwok Yue Hoh
- Edited by: Zheng Qiang
- Music by: Zhou Peifan
- Production companies: Baisi Film and Entertainment Manufacture Co., LTD.
- Distributed by: Baisi Film and Entertainment Manufacture Co., LTD.
- Release date: 19 November 1992 (British Hong Kong)
- Running time: 86 minutes
- Country: British Hong Kong
- Language: Cantonese
- Box office: HK$1,541,972.00

Vietnamese Lady is a 1992 Hong Kong sex film directed by Ka Ka and written by Heung Sang Kong, starring Gwok Yee Lee, Melvin Wong, Ling Ga, and Chan Wing Chun. The film premiered in British Hong Kong on 19 November 1992.

== Plot summary ==
Cantonese businessman Kiu doesn't have time to woo a girl. On a trip to Saigon, he offers financial help to poor girl Shun's (very troubled) family if she'll come and live with him. With a sense of duty but not love, she agrees, too timid to even tell boyfriend Lik just after losing her virginity to him. Love fails to blossom between Shun and Kiu in Hong Kong, and Kiu starts to drink heavily. Sandy, Kiu's luscious secretary, takes advantage and gets it off with him in the gym and disgusts Shun in the process. Shun gets drunk and is picked up in a bar, nearly raped, and rescued then befriended by a fellow Vietnamese girl in what is clearly a set up. Sandy turns out to be behind this as well, to get Shun out of the way and have Kiu all to herself. But things don't go according to anyone's plan. Will Shun give up Kiu and his money to go back to Lik? Will Sandy hold her nerve and push ahead? And will the guys Sandy paid to set up Shun have their way with Sandy instead?

== Cast ==
- Gwok Yee Lee (郭绮莉) as yuen shun, the Vietnamese lady.
- Melvin Wong as kiu man woo.
- Ling Ga as Sandy.
- Chan Wing Chun
- Ho Chiu Kei as Sonny
- Chuen Sing Lee
- Jan Wai Ng

== Release ==
It was released in British Hong Kong on 19 November 1992.

== Box office ==
The film grossed HK$1,541,972.00.
